There are 27 mammal species native to Ireland or naturalised in both the Republic of Ireland and Northern Ireland before 1500. The Red List of Irish terrestrial mammals was updated in 2019, with assessments of these 27 species. One species is locally extinct, one is vulnerable and 25 are least concern species. Not assessed were nine mammal species that were introduced after 1500.

The following tags are used to highlight each species' conservation status as assessed on the IUCN Red List:

Order: Diprotodontia (kangaroos, wallabies, wombats and allies)
Though most marsupials make up a great part of the fauna in the Australian region, the red-necked wallaby has been introduced to Ireland: a population is currently breeding on Lambay island.
Family: Macropodidae (kangaroos, wallabies, and kin)
Genus: Notamacropus
 Red-necked wallaby, N. rufogriseus  introduced

Order: Rodentia (rodents)

Rodents make up the largest order of mammals, with over 40% of mammalian species. They have two incisors in the upper and lower jaw which grow continually and must be kept short by gnawing.
Suborder: Sciurognathi
Family: Sciuridae (squirrels)
Subfamily: Sciurinae
Genus: Sciurus
 Eastern grey squirrel, S. carolinensis  introduced
 Red squirrel, S. vulgaris 
Family: Cricetidae
Subfamily: Arvicolinae
Genus: Myodes
 Bank vole, M. glareolus  introduced
Family: Muridae (mice, rats, etc.)
Subfamily: Murinae
Genus: Apodemus
 Wood mouse, A. sylvaticus 
Genus: Mus
House mouse, M. musculus 
Genus: Rattus
 Brown rat, R. norvegicus  introduced
 Black rat, R. rattus 
Family: Gliridae
Subfamily: Leithiinae
Genus: Muscardinus
 Hazel dormouse, M. avellanarius  introduced
Suborder: Hystricomorpha
Family: Echimyidae (neotropical spiny rats)
Subfamily: Echimyinae
Genus: Myocastor
 Coypu, M. coypus  introduced

Order: Lagomorpha (lagomorphs)

The lagomorphs comprise two families, Leporidae (hares and rabbits), and Ochotonidae (pikas). Though they can resemble rodents, and were classified as a superfamily in that order until the early 20th century, they have since been considered a separate order. They differ from rodents in a number of physical characteristics, such as having four incisors in the upper jaw rather than two.
Family: Leporidae (rabbits, hares)
Genus: Lepus
European hare, L. europaeus  introduced
Mountain hare, L. timidus 
Genus: Oryctolagus
European rabbit, O. cuniculus  introduced

Order: Erinaceomorpha (hedgehogs and gymnures)

The order Erinaceomorpha contains a single family, Erinaceidae, which comprise the hedgehogs and gymnures. The hedgehogs are easily recognised by their spines while gymnures look more like large rats.

Family: Erinaceidae (hedgehogs)
Subfamily: Erinaceinae
Genus: Erinaceus
 West European hedgehog, E. europaeus

Order: Soricomorpha (shrews, moles, and solenodons)

The "shrew-forms" are insectivorous mammals. The shrews and solenodons closely resemble mice while the moles are stout-bodied burrowers.

Family: Soricidae (shrews)
Subfamily: Soricinae
Genus: Crocidura
 Greater white-toothed shrew, C. russula  introduced
Genus: Sorex
 Eurasian pygmy shrew, S. minutus  introduced

Order: Chiroptera (bats)

The bats' most distinguishing feature is that their forelimbs are developed as wings, making them the only mammals capable of flight. Bat species account for about 20% of all mammals.

Family: Vespertilionidae
Subfamily: Myotinae
Genus: Myotis
 Brandt's bat, M. brandti 
 Daubenton's bat, M. daubentonii 
 Whiskered bat, M. mystacinus 
 Natterer's bat, M. nattereri 
Subfamily: Vespertilioninae
Genus: Nyctalus
 Lesser noctule, N. leisleri 
Genus: Pipistrellus
 Nathusius' pipistrelle, P. nathusii 
 Common pipistrelle, P. pipistrellus 
 Soprano pipistrelle, P. pygmaeus 
Genus: Plecotus
 Brown long-eared bat, P. auritus 
Family: Rhinolophidae
Subfamily: Rhinolophinae
Genus: Rhinolophus
Lesser horseshoe bat, R. hipposideros

Order: Cetacea (whales)

The order Cetacea includes whales, dolphins, and porpoises. They are the mammals most fully adapted to aquatic life with a spindle-shaped nearly hairless body, protected by a thick layer of blubber, and forelimbs and tail modified to provide propulsion underwater.

Suborder: Mysticeti
Family: Balaenidae (right whales)
Genus: Balaena
 Bowhead whale, B. mysticetus  vagrant
Genus: Eubalaena
 North Atlantic right whale, E. glacialis 
Family: Balaenopteridae (rorqual)
Subfamily: Balaenopterinae
Genus: Balaenoptera
 Common minke whale, B. acutorostrata 
 Sei whale, B. borealis 
 Blue whale, B. musculus 
 Fin whale, B. physalus 
Family: Megapterinae
Genus: Megaptera
 Humpback whale, Megaptera novaeangliae 
Suborder: Odontoceti
Superfamily: Platanistoidea
Family: Monodontidae (narwhals)
Genus: Delphinapterus
 Beluga, Delphinapterus leucas  vagrant
Family: Phocoenidae (porpoises)
Genus: Phocoena
 Harbour porpoise, Phocoena phocoena 
Family: Physeteridae (sperm whales)
Genus: Physeter
 Sperm whale, Physeter macrocephalus 
Family: Kogiidae
Genus: Kogia
 Pygmy sperm whale, Kogia breviceps 
Family: Ziphidae (beaked whales)
Genus: Ziphius
 Cuvier's beaked whale, Ziphius cavirostris 
Subfamily: Hyperoodontinae
Genus: Hyperoodon
 Northern bottlenose whale, Hyperoodon ampullatus 
Genus: Mesoplodon
 Sowerby's beaked whale, Mesoplodon bidens 
 Gervais' beaked whale, Mesoplodon europaeus 
 True's beaked whale, Mesoplodon mirus 
Family: Delphinidae (marine dolphins)
 Genus: Lagenorhynchus
 White-beaked dolphin, Lagenorhynchus albirostris 
 Genus: Leucopleurus
 Atlantic white-sided dolphin, Leucopleurus acutus 
Genus: Delphinus
 Short-beaked common dolphin, Delphinus delphis 
Genus: Tursiops
 Common bottlenose dolphin, Tursiops truncatus 
Genus: Stenella
 Striped dolphin, Stenella coeruleoalba 
Genus: Grampus
 Risso's dolphin, Grampus griseus 
Genus: Globicephala
 Long-finned pilot whale, Globicephala melas 
Genus: Pseudorca
 False killer whale, Pseudorca crassidens 
Genus: Orcinus
 Orca, Orcinus orca

Order: Carnivora (carnivorans)

Carnivorans include over 260 species, the majority of which eat meat as their primary dietary item. They have a characteristic skull shape and dentition.

Suborder: Caniformia
Family: Canidae (dogs, foxes)
Genus: Vulpes
 Red fox, V. vulpes 
Family: Mustelidae (mustelids)
Genus: Lutra
 European otter, L. lutra 
Genus: Martes
 European pine marten, M. martes 
Genus: Meles
 European badger, M. meles 
Genus: Mustela
 Stoat, M. erminea 
 Irish stoat, M. e. hibernica
Genus: Neogale
American mink, N. vison  introduced
Family: Phocidae (earless seals)
Genus: Cystophora
 Hooded seal, C. cristatus  vagrant
Genus: Erignathus
 Bearded seal, E. barbatus  vagrant
Genus: Halichoerus
 Grey seal, H. grypus 
Genus: Pagophilus
 Harp seal,  P. groenlandicus  vagrant
Genus: Phoca
 Common seal, P. vitulina 
Genus: Pusa
 Ringed seal, P. hispida  vagrant
Family: Odobenidae (walruses)
Genus: Odobenus
 Walrus, O. rosmarus  presence uncertain, vagrant

Order: Artiodactyla (even-toed ungulates)

The even-toed ungulates are ungulates whose weight is borne about equally by the third and fourth toes, rather than mostly or entirely by the third as in perissodactyls. There are about 220 artiodactyl species, including many that are of great economic importance to humans.

Family: Cervidae (deer)
Subfamily: Capreolinae
Genus: Capreolus
Roe deer, C. capreolus  introduced
Subfamily: Cervinae
Genus: Cervus
 Red deer, C. elaphus  reintroduced
 Sika deer, C. nippon  introduced
Genus: Dama
 European fallow deer, D. dama  introduced
Genus: Muntiacus
 Reeves's muntjac, M. reevesi  introduced

Order: Primates (lemurs, apes)
Family: Hominidae (great apes)
Subfamily: Homininae 
Genus: Homo
 Human, H. sapien

Locally extinct
The following species are locally extinct in the country:
 Wolf, Canis lupus, see Wolves in Ireland
 Eurasian lynx, Lynx lynx
 Reindeer, Rangifer tarandus
 Wild boar, Sus scrofa
 Brown bear, Ursus arctos, see Bears in Ireland

Comparison with Great Britain
The following species are found in Great Britain but not in Ireland:
Field vole, Microtus agrestis
Common vole, M. arvalis
Water vole, Arvicola terrestris
Harvest mouse, Micromys minutus
Yellow-necked mouse, A. flavicollis
Edible dormouse, Glis glis
European mole, Talpa europaea
Common shrew, Sorex araneus
Eurasian water shrew, Neomys fodiens
Lesser white-toothed shrew, Crocidura suaveolens
Greater horseshoe bat, Rhinolophus ferrumequinum
Greater mouse-eared bat, Myotis myotis
Bechstein's bat, M. bechsteini
Parti-coloured bat, Vespertilio murinus
Serotine bat, Eptesicus serotinus
Northern bat, E. nilssoni
Common noctule, Nyctalus noctula
Barbastelle, Barbastella barbastellus
Grey long-eared bat, Plecotus austriacus
Least weasel, Mustela nivalis
European polecat, M. putorius
European wildcat, Felis silvestris
Wild boar, Sus scrofa
Water deer, Hydropotes inermis introduced c. 1896
Eurasian beaver, Castor fiber reintroduced 2009

See also
List of chordate orders
Lists of mammals by region
Mammal classification
Fauna of Ireland
Deer of Ireland
Wolves in Ireland
Bears in Ireland

References

External links

Smiddy, P. 1999 Re-assessment of the Irish records of ringed, harp and hooded seals. Irish Naturalists' Journal 26: 249-250
Ulster Museum Northern Ireland Mammals, Amphibians and Reptiles. Includes more extinct mammals.
NPWS Breeding populations of Grey seals in the Republic of Ireland
Irish Whale and Dolphin Group
After 5,000 years, Kerry red deer as Irish as can be, DNA analysis shows

Species Profile Browser · Species Profile

Ireland
Mammals
Mammals
Ireland